The Letter of Tansar was a 6th-century Sassanid propaganda instrument that portrayed the preceding Arsacid period as morally corrupt and heretical (to Zoroastrianism), and presented the first Sassanid dynast Ardashir I as having "restored" the faith to a "firm foundation." The letter was simultaneously a declaration of the unity of Zoroastrian church and Iranian state, "for church and state were born of the one womb, joined together and never to be sundered."

The document seems to have been based on a genuine 3rd-century letter written by Tansar, the Zoroastrian high priest under Ardashir I, to a certain Gushnasp of Parishwar/Tabaristan, one of vassal kings of the Arsacid Ardavan IV. This original missive was apparently written not long after Ardashir had overthrown Ardavan, and Tansar appears to have been responding to charges levelled at Ardashir, and the delay in accepting Ardashir's suzerainty. Representative of those charges is the accusation that Ardashir "had taken away fires from the fire-temples, extinguished them and blotted them out." To this, Tansar replies that it was the "kings of the peoples [i.e. Parthians' vassal kings]" that began the practice of dynastic fires, an "innovation" unauthorized by the kings of old. A similar response appears in Book IV of the 9th century Denkard.

The letter was revised in the 6th-century, during the reign of Khusrow I Anoshiravan. The legend that the Arsacid Parthians had allowed Zoroastrianism to fall into neglect stems from the same period. The letter was translated into Arabic in the 9th century by Ibn al-Muqaffa, and from Arabic into New Persian in the 13th-century when Ibn Isfandiyar, an Iranian Muslim, put it in his History of Tabaristan (a mountainous region in northern Iran). The Ibn Isfandiar version, which dates to 1210–1216, is the only one that survives. 

The importance of the Letter of Tansar was first perceived by James Darmesteter, who published the first critical translation of it in 1894.

References
Citations

Bibliography

 .
 .
 .
 .
 .
 .

Zoroastrian texts
6th century in Iran
Propaganda by topic
Sasanian Empire
Letters (message)